Grützmacher is a surname. Notable people with the surname include:

Friedel Grützmacher (born 1942), German politician
Friedrich Grützmacher (1832–1903), German cellist and composer
Leopold Grützmacher (1835–1900), German cellist and composer
Sabine Grützmacher (born 1986), German politician